Shrunken Heads is the eleventh solo album of British singer-songwriter Ian Hunter and his first since 2001's critically acclaimed Rant.

A bonus CD containing an additional three tracks was included with preorders placed on Ian's web site.

Track listing
All tracks written by Ian Hunter except where noted
"Words (Big Mouth)" (Hunter, Andy York) – 5:03
"Fuss About Nothin'" – 3:44
"When the World Was Round" – 4:50
"Brainwashed" – 3:40
"Shrunken Heads" – 7:45
"Soul of America" – 4:43
"How's Your House" – 4:18
"Guiding Light" – 4:09
"Stretch" – 4:12
"I Am What I Hated When I Was Young" – 3:05
"Read 'Em 'N' Weep" – 5:02
"Your Eyes" – 3.49 *
"Wasted" – 5.05 *
"Real or Imaginary" – 3.39 *

 * Tracks on the bonus CD

Personnel
Ian Hunter - lead vocals, acoustic guitar, piano, harmonica, backing vocals
Andy York - acoustic, electric, 12-string guitar, piano, banjo, ukulele, Wurlitzer, backing vocals, gang vocals
Steve Holley - drums, percussion, gang vocals
Graham Maby - bass, gang vocals
James Mastro - slide, electric, solo, Barytone, buzzsaw guitar, e-bow
Andy Burton - keyboards, Wurlitzer, organ, accordion, piano
Jack Petruzzelli - mando, electric, Leslie, Phaser guitar, Omnichord, Wah-Wah
Mark Bosch - solo guitar
Soozie Tyrell - strings
Peter Mushay - keyboards
Rick Tedesco - staccato piano
Tony Shanahan - upright bass
Mary Lee Kortes - vocals, backing vocals
Christine Ohlman - vocals, backing vocals
A. Buryon - gang vocals
Jesse Hunter Patterson - gang vocals
Dennis Dunaway - gang vocals
Jeff Tweedy - backing vocals on tracks 1, 2, 8

References

2007 albums
Ian Hunter (singer) albums